Tamara Olga Acosta Zambra (born 5 February 1972) is a prominent Chilean actress.

Career 
She is a recognized figure of theater, television, and above all is known as "the muse of Chilean cinema" because she has participated in a large number of films produced in Chile. She has won several awards at international festivals. Her first television appearance was on Sábado Gigante Internacional in 1991, as a participant in a situation contest.

Filmography

Television

Telenovelas

Series and miniseries

Appearances 
 La ruta de la seda (TVN, 2001) – Co-host
 La ruta de Amazonía (TVN, 2007) – Co-host
  (Canal 13, 2008) – Guest
  (Canal 13, 2010) – Guest
  (Zona Latina, 2012) – Guest
  (Canal 13, 2012) – Guest
  (TVN, 2013) –  Guest
 Dudo (2013) – Guest

Theater 
 Madame de Sade (1993)
 La visita (1996), directed by Claudia Di Girolamo
 Los Ciegos (1997)
 Las Huachas (2008)
 Topografía de un Desnudo (2010)
 Amledi, El Tonto (2010)
 Padre (2011)
 Persiguiendo a Nora Helmer (2012)
 Lady Marginal (2017), directed by Claudia Di Girolamo

Awards

Altazor

APES

Copihue de Oro

TV Grama

Caleuche

Other awards

References

External links 

 

1972 births
20th-century Chilean actresses
21st-century Chilean actresses
Chilean film actresses
Chilean stage actresses
Chilean telenovela actresses
Chilean television presenters
Living people
People from Maipo Province
Chilean women television presenters
Chilean television personalities